Acanthodactylus ilgazi is a species of lizard in the family Lacertidae. The species is endemic to Turkey.

References

Acanthodactylus
Reptiles described in 2021